Indira Radić (born 14 June 1966) is a Bosnian Serb pop-folk singer. She has established herself on the music scene of the former Yugoslavia and Bulgaria and sings almost exclusively in her native tongue. In the period from 1992 to 2015 she released 16 albums mixing pop, dance and traditional folk elements. This hybrid style, described as pop-folk, brought her success throughout the region with songs like "Ratovanje" that incorporated Indian elements.

Early life
Indira Radić was born as Indira Subotić to Bosnian Serb parents Živko Subotić and Rosa Radić in the village of Dragalovci near the Bosnian town of Doboj. She was named after the Indian Prime Minister Indira Gandhi. After finishing primary school, she enrolled in a medical school in Doboj before working as a nurse for three years in the Mladen Stojanović Hospital in Zagreb.

Career

1992–98
During the early 1990s, Radić entered a contest for amateur singers and was selected to appear in the final scheduled to be held in Sarajevo. However, this was cancelled as it coincided with the start of the Bosnian War in springtime of 1992. A few months later, Radić contacted the record label Diskos and recorded her first album Nagrada i kazna (Prize and Punishment, 1992) with the band Južni Vetar. After the release of her first album, she moved to Belgrade with her family to build a career. She recorded two more albums with Južni Vetar, Zbog tebe (Because of You, 1993), and Ugasi me (Turn Me Off, 1994), before releasing her first self-titled solo album (1995) on the record label PGP-RTS. It contained the song "Srpkinja je mene majka rodila" (I Was Born By a Serb Mother).

In 1996, Radić met Saša Popović and moved to his ZaM production team where she recorded three albums. First of these was Krug (Circle), which elevated her image. It was followed by Izdajnik (Traitor, 1997) and award-winning Voliš li me ti (Do You Love Me, 1998), which provided Radić with many successful performances and tours.

2000–09
In 2000, Radić continued working with Grand Production (previously ZaM), releasing the album Milenijum (Millennium) that same year and Gde ćemo večeras (Where Are We Going Tonight) in 2001.

A milestone of Radić's career was when she recorded the duet "Lopov" (Thief) with Alen Islamović, a singer of the Yugoslav rock band Bijelo Dugme; the duet was composed and produced by Goran Ratković Rale for her 2002 album Pocrnela burma (My Wedding Ring Turned Black). The duet, which incorporated pop-folk, a mix of folk melodies and Western pop music, has achieved great success.

In 2003, Radić released the album Zmaj (Dragon). It included the songs "Moj živote dal si živ" (My Life, Are You Alive), "Tika-tak" (Tick-Tock), "Bio si mi drag" (You Were Dear to Me) and "Pedeset godina" (Fifty Years) and the title track, among others. The album received numerous awards among which was an Album of the Year, The Hits and Album of the Decade, and Top-selling Album. Her songs from Zmaj were translated into Bulgarian, Romanian, Greek, Albanian and Romani.

In the successor states of Yugoslavia, Radić became initially successful in Bosnia and Herzegovina, Serbia, Macedonia and Montenegro. Radić then went on a Balkan tour. On 27 April 2004, she held her first, and at that time, the most successful concert in show business in Sports Hall in Belgrade.

She was given an award in Bulgaria for being the "most popular and best singer in the Balkans" in 2005. Between 2004 and 2006, Radić had a successful tour and in 2006 received the award for the largest number of concerts held.

Radić released the album Ljubav kad prestane (When Love Ends, 2005), featuring the hit songs "April", "Deset devet tri dva jedan" (Ten, Nine, Three, Two, One) and the title track. It was followed in 2007 by Lepo se provedi (Have a Good Time) with the hit song "Imali smo, nismo znali" (We Had It, We Didn't Know). In 2008, the controversial single "Pije mi se" (I Feel Like Drinking), off the album Heroji (Heroes, 2008), included a music video in which two men were shown kissing. On that same album she sang a duet entitled "Hajde sestro" (Come On, Sister) with singer Ksenija Pajčin. In October that year, she sang the song "Ako umrem sad" (If I Die Now, a song later included on her 2011 album) and in December 2008 she released the full album Heroji. In addition, Indira was declared the Serbian gay icon of 2008.

In 2009, she received an award for Singer of the Year. In mid-2009, Radić recorded the duet "Možda baš ti" (Maybe Just You) with Ivan Plavšić. The duet's entire proceeds went to charity, and consequently she won the Big Heart Award from Put humanizma (Path of Humanism) and the Princess Katherine Karađorđević Fund. In October 2009, Radić promoted two singles "Pusti me" (Let Me Go) and "Živim da živim" (I Live to Live)

2010–present
 
In December 2011, Indira released her fifteenth album entitled Istok, sever, jug i zapad (East, North, South and West). The album included 17 new songs including "Marija" (Mary), which Indira recorded in French in a duet with Stanko Marinković.

Discography

Studio albums
Nagrada i kazna (Prize and Punishment, 1992)  with Južni Vetar
Zbog tebe (Because of You, 1993) with Južni Vetar
Ugasi me (Turn Me Off, 1994) with Južni Vetar
Idi iz života moga (Get Out of My Life, 1995)
Krug (Circle, 1996) with Srki Boy
Izdajnik (Traitor, 1997)
Voliš li me ti (Do You Love Me, 1998)
Milenijum (Millennium, 2000)
Gde ćemo večeras (Where Are We Going Tonight, 2001)
Pocrnela burma (Wedding Ring Turned Black, 2002)
Zmaj (Dragon, 2003)
Ljubav kad prestane (When Love Stops, 2005)
Lepo se provedi (Have a Good Time, 2007)
Heroji (Heroes, 2008)
Istok, sever, jug i zapad (East, North, South and West, 2011)
Niko nije savršen (Nobody Is Perfect, 2015)

Compilation albums
Best of Indira (2013)

Live albums
Hala Sportova 27.04.2004. Beograd (2004)
Звезди на сцената - Live (2005) with Ivana

References

Sources

External links

1966 births
Living people
People from Doboj
Yugoslav women singers
20th-century Serbian women singers
Serbian turbo-folk singers
20th-century Bosnia and Herzegovina women singers
Bosnia and Herzegovina turbo-folk singers
Bosnia and Herzegovina folk-pop singers
Bosnia and Herzegovina emigrants to Serbia
Serbs of Bosnia and Herzegovina
Grand Production artists
21st-century Serbian women singers